National Bomb is a 2004 Azerbaijani-Russian comedy film directed by Vagif Mustafayev. It was entered into the 26th Moscow International Film Festival.

Cast
 Yashar Nuri
 Nuriya Akhmedova
 Saida Kulieva
 Avtandil Makharadze

References

External links
 

2004 films
2004 comedy films
2004 comedy-drama films
2004 black comedy films
2004 multilingual films
Azerbaijani multilingual films
Azerbaijani comedy-drama films
Russian multilingual films
Russian black comedy films
Russian comedy-drama films
2000s Russian-language films
Azerbaijani-language films
Films directed by Vagif Mustafayev